Maragheh (also Romanized as Marāgheh; also known as Maragheb) is a village in Sang Bast Rural District, in the Central District of Fariman County, Razavi Khorasan Province, Iran. At the 2006 census, its population was 358, in 104 families.

References 

Populated places in Fariman County